Colby O is the debut and only studio album by American singer Colby O'Donis. It was released on September 16, 2008 through Akon's record label Kon Live.

Background
Akon served as executive producer and co-wrote 10 tracks with O'Donis (Colby wrote or co-wrote 14 of the 15), and produced eight tracks, including "What You Got." O'Donis produced another four and together they produced one. In an interview O'Donis mentioned to have worked with many African producers including South African producer SpineCracker. O'Donis commented on the writing process as "writing my own songs is extremely important to me. I feel that I've gone through so much in my life and there's no better way of showing the real you than through music. It's a way for me and my fans to connect through the same struggles. There's so much more of me that I haven't revealed and music is my way of letting people know who I am." According to O'Donis, he and Akon had recorded around forty songs for the album and "it was hard to get it down to a manageable number." O'Donis got inspirations from "girls" and "life in general, past experiences and feelings I've gone through."

Colby O includes the Top 40 song "What You Got" featuring Akon and other singles "Don't Turn Back" and "Let You Go". Other guest appearances include T-Pain, Lil Romeo, and Paul Wall. In addition, the O'Donis plays guitar on the album, as well as bass, drums, percussion, synthesizer and keyboards. According to Colby, his album took three years to make because he wanted every song to be a single. As of December 2008, Colby O has sold 142,751 copies.

Track listing

Charts

References

2008 debut albums
Colby O'Donis albums
Albums produced by Akon
Albums produced by The-Dream
Albums produced by Tricky Stewart
Albums produced by T-Pain
Geffen Records albums
KonLive Distribution albums